The list of shipwrecks in June 1855 includes ships sunk, wrecked, grounded, or otherwise lost during June 1855.

1 June

2 June

3 June

4 June

5 June

6 June

7 June

8 June

9 June

12 June

14 June

15 June

16 June

17 June

18 June

20 June

21 June

22 June

24 June

25 June

26 June

28 June

29 June

30 June

Unknown date

References

1855-06